The Cenci. A Tragedy, in Five Acts (1819) is a verse drama in five acts by Percy Bysshe Shelley written in the summer of 1819, and inspired by a real Italian family, the House of Cenci (in particular, Beatrice Cenci, pronounced CHEN-chee). Shelley composed the play in Rome and at Villa Valsovano near Livorno, from May to August 5, 1819. The work was published by Charles and James Ollier in London in 1819. The Livorno edition was printed in Livorno, Italy by Shelley himself in a run of 250 copies. Shelley told Thomas Love Peacock that he arranged for the printing himself because in Italy "it costs, with all duties and freightage, about half of what it would cost in London." Shelley sought to have the play staged, describing it as "totally different from anything you might conjecture that I should write; of a more popular kind... written for the multitude." Shelley wrote to his publisher Charles Ollier that he was confident that the play "will succeed as a publication." A second edition appeared in 1821, his only published work to go into a second edition during his lifetime.

The play was not considered stageable in its day due to its themes of incest and parricide, and was not performed in public in England until 1922, when it was staged in London. In 1886 the Shelley Society had sponsored a private production at the Grand Theatre, Islington, before an audience that included Oscar Wilde, Robert Browning, and George Bernard Shaw. Though there has been much debate over the play's stageability, it has been produced in many countries, including France, Germany, Italy, Russia, Czechoslovakia, and the United States. It was included in the Harvard Classics as one of the most important and representative works of the Western canon.

Plot

The horrific tragedy, set in 1599 in Rome, of a young woman executed for premeditated murder of her tyrannical father, was a well-known true story handed down orally and documented in the Annali d'Italia, a twelve-volume chronicle of Italian history written by Ludovico Antonio Muratori in 1749. The events occurred during the Pontificate of Pope Clement VIII.

Shelley was first drawn to dramatize the tale after viewing a supposed portrait of Beatrice Cenci, then attributed to Guido Reni, a painting that intrigued Shelley's poetic imagination.  It is now thought to be by Ginevra Cantofoli.

Act I

The play opens with Cardinal Camillo discussing with Count Francesco Cenci a murder in which Cenci is implicated. Camillo tells Cenci that the matter will be hushed up if Cenci will relinquish a third of his possessions, his property beyond the Pincian gate, to the Church. Count Cenci has sent two of his sons, Rocco and Cristofano, to Salamanca, Spain in the expectation that they will die of starvation. The Count's virtuous daughter, Beatrice, and Orsino, a prelate in love with Beatrice, discuss petitioning the Pope to relieve the Cenci family from the Count's brutal rule. Orsino withholds the petition, however, revealing himself to be disingenuous, lustful for Beatrice, and greedy. After he hears the news that his sons have been brutally killed in Salamanca, the Count holds a feast in celebration of their deaths, commanding his guests to revel with him. Cenci drinks wine which he imagines as "my children's blood" which he "did thirst to drink!" During the feast, Beatrice pleads with the guests to protect her family from her sadistic father, but the guests refuse, in fear of Cenci's brutality and retribution.

Act II

Count Cenci torments Beatrice and her stepmother, Lucretia, and announces his plan to imprison them in his castle in Petrella. A servant returns Beatrice's petition to the Pope, unopened, and Beatrice and Lucretia despair over the last hope of salvation from the Count. Orsino encourages Cenci's son, Giacomo, upset over Cenci's appropriation of Giacomo's wife's dowry, to murder Cenci.

Act III

Beatrice reveals to Lucretia that the Count has committed an unnameable act against her and expresses feelings of spiritual and physical contamination, implying Cenci's incestuous rape of his daughter. Orsino and Lucretia agree with Beatrice's suggestion that the Count must be murdered. After the first attempt at patricide fails because Cenci arrives early, Orsino conspires with Beatrice, Lucretia, and Giacomo, in a second assassination plot. Orsino proposes that two of Cenci's ill-treated servants, Marzio and Olimpio, carry out the murder.

Act IV

The scene shifts to the Petrella Castle in the Apulian Apennines. Olimpio and Marzio enter Cenci's bedchamber to murder him but hesitate to kill the sleeping Count and return to the conspirators with the deed undone. Threatening to kill Cenci herself, Beatrice shames the servants into action, and Olimpio and Marzio strangle the Count and throw his body out of the room off the balcony, where it is entangled in a pine. Shortly thereafter, Savella, a papal legate, arrives with a murder charge and execution order against Cenci. Upon finding the Count's dead body, the legate arrests the conspirators, with the exception of Orsino, who escapes in disguise.

Act V

The suspects are taken for trial for murder in Rome. Marzio is tortured and confesses to the murder, implicating Cenci's family members. Despite learning that Lucretia and Giacomo have also confessed, Beatrice refuses to do so, steadfastly insisting on her innocence. At the trial, all of the conspirators are found guilty and sentenced to death. Bernardo, another of Cenci's sons, attempts a futile last-minute appeal to the Pope to have mercy on his family. The Pope is reported to have declared: "They must die." The play concludes with Beatrice walking stoically to her execution for murder. Her final words are: "We are quite ready. Well, 'tis very well."

Major characters

 Count Francesco Cenci, head of the Cenci household and family
 Beatrice, his daughter
 Lucretia, the wife of Francesco Cenci and the stepmother of his children
 Cardinal Camillo
 Orsino, a Prelate
 Savella, the Pope's Legate
 Andrea, a servant to Francesco Cenci
 Marzio, an assassin
 Olimpio, an assassin
 Giacomo, son of Francesco Cenci
 Bernardo, son of Francesco Cenci

Performance History

England 
The play was first staged in England by the Shelley Society in 1886. It did not receive its first public performance in England until 1922.

France 
The play's second production was in France was in 1891, directed by Lugnè-Poe at the Theatre d'Art.:1097

Antonin Artaud adaptation 
Antonin Artaud staged his adaptation Les Cenci in 1935 at the Theatre Folies-Wagram.:1099 The production closed after 17 performances due to poor reviews.:132 Artaud staged the production in line with his theory for a Theatre of Cruelty, though he stated that it "is not Theatre of Cruelty yet, but is a preparation for it.":103 Artaud drew on Shelley's text, as well as a version of the tale by Stendhal, and his adaptation "exaggerated the sadistic and pathological elements of the play to a point of violence".:1099

Critical reception
In his May 15, 1886 review of the play, Oscar Wilde concluded: "In fact no one has more clearly understood than Shelley the mission of the dramatist and the meaning of the drama." Alfred and H. Buxton Forman also praised The Cenci as a "tragic masterpiece", elevating Shelley into the company of Sophocles, Euripides, and Shakespeare. Leigh Hunt, to whom the play was dedicated, effused over Shelley's "great sweetness of nature, and enthusiasm for good". Mary Shelley, in her note on the play, wrote that "[u]niversal approbation soon stamped The Cenci as the best tragedy of modern times." She critically assessed Act V: "The Fifth Act is a masterpiece. It is the finest thing he ever wrote, and may claim proud comparison not only with any contemporary, but preceding, poet." She noted that "Shelley wished The Cenci to be acted", intending the work, which she wrote was of "surpassing excellence", to be an acting play, not a "closet drama". Shelley sought unsuccessfully to have the play staged at Covent Garden.

Byron wrote his criticisms of the play in a letter to Shelley: "I read Cenci – but, besides that I think the subject essentially un-dramatic, I am not a great admirer of our old dramatists as models. I deny that the English have hitherto had a drama at all. Your Cenci, however, was a work of power and poetry." Byron told Thomas Medwin in conversation: "The Cenci is... perhaps the best tragedy modern times have produced." William Wordsworth reportedly called the play "the greatest tragedy of the age." After seeing a performance of the play in 1886, George Bernard Shaw commented that "Shelley and Shakespeare are the only dramatists who have dealt in despair of this quality."

A reviewer writing for the Literary Gazette in 1820, on the other hand, wrote that the play was "noxious", "odious", and "abominable". The taboo subjects of incest, patricide, and parricide, as well as the negative depiction of the Roman Catholic Church, however, prevented The Cenci from being staged publicly.

Opera adaptations
German composer Berthold Goldschmidt composed an opera in three acts based on the Shelley play in 1949 entitled Beatrice Cenci (opera) with a libretto by Martin Esslin "after Shelley's verse drama The Cenci". The opera won first prize in the Festival of Britain opera competition in 1951. The opera was first performed in 1988. A critically lauded production starring Roberta Alexander as the title heroine was staged at the Opernfest in Berlin in 1994. The first staged production of Beatrice Cenci in the UK was by the Trinity College of Music on July 9–11, 1998.

In 1951, British classical composer Havergal Brian composed an opera based on the Shelley play entitled The Cenci (opera), an opera in eight scenes. The opera premiered in 1997 in the UK in a performance in London by the Millennium Sinfonia conducted by James Kelleher..

In 1971, Beatrix Cenci premiered, an opera in two acts by Alberto Ginastera to a Spanish libretto by the playwright William Shand.

Other works titled The Cenci
Other works titled The Cenci include an 1837 novella by Marie-Henri Beyle (Stendhal), and an 1840 true crime essay by Alexandre Dumas père included in Volume 1 of Celebrated Crimes.

Productions of Shelley's The Cenci
 (1886) Grand Theatre, Islington, London, UK (private production)
 (1891) Paris, France
 (1919) Moscow, Russia
 (1920) Moscow, Russia
 (1922) Prague, Czechoslovakia
 (1922) New Theatre, London, UK
 (1926) London, UK
 (1933) Armenian Cultural Society of Los Angeles, California (in Armenian)
 (1935) People's Theatre, Newcastle, UK
 (1936) Yale University
 (1940) Bellingham, Washington
 (1947) Equity Library Theatre, New York
 (1947) BBC radio production
 (1948) BBC radio production
 (1948) Princeton University
 (1949) Mt. Holyoke College
 (1950) Walt Whitman School
 (1950) University of Utah
 (1953) Company of the Swan, London, UK
 (1953) Oxford, UK
(1970) La MaMa Experimental Theatre Club, New York, NY
 (1975) Emerson College, Boston, Massachusetts
 (1977) Jean Cocteau Repertory, Bouwerie Lane Theater, New York
 (1985) Almeida Theatre, London, UK
 (1991) Lyric Studio, London, UK
 (1992) Red Heel Theatre at Studio 5, Walnut Street Theater, Philadelphia, PA
 (1995) Spotlighter's Theatre, Baltimore, Maryland
 (1995) Elmhurst College, Elmhurst, IL
 (1997) North Pole Theatre, Greenwich, London, UK
 (1997) The Swinish Multitude (with London University Theatre Company), Westminster, London, UK
 (1997) El Teatro Campesino, San Juan Bautista, California
 (2001) People's Theatre, Newcastle upon Tyne, UK
 (2003) Hayman Theatre, Perth, Western Australia
 (2005) The Lizard Loft and Cruel Theatre, Honolulu, Hawaii
 (2008) University of Guelph, Ontario, Canada
 (2008) Vassar College, New York
 (2008) Red Bull Theater, Theatre at St. Clement's, New York
 (2008) Shakespeare Performance Troupe, Bryn Mawr College, Pennsylvania
 (2009) Mestno gledališče ljubljansko, Ljubljana, Slovenia (in Slovenian)
 (2010) East Los Angeles College, Monterey Park, California
 (2011) Beijing Fringe Festival (in Chinese)
 (2019) Amitis Theater Group, Nufel Lushato Theater, Tehran (in Persian)
 (2019) Western University, London, Ontario, Canada

Notes

References

Further reading
 Adams, Charles L. "The Structure of The Cenci.” Drama Survey, 4, 2 (Summer, 1965): 139–48.
 An, Young-Ok. (1996). "Beatrice's Gaze Revisited: Anatomizing The Cenci." Criticism, 37, pp. 27–88.
 Anderson, Martin. "Classical: The new life of Brian's `Cenci': Havergal Brian's `The Cenci' QEH, SBC, London." The Independent, 19 December 1997.
 Bates, Ernest Sutherland. A Study of Shelley's Drama, The Cenci. New York: Columbia University Press, 1908.
 Behrendt, Stephen C. “Beatrice Cenci and the Tragic Myth of History,” in History & Myth: Essays on English Romantic Literature, edited by Stephen C. Behrendt, Wayne State University Press, 1990, pp. 214–34.
 Blood, Roger. (1994). "Allegory and Dramatic Representation in The Cenci." SIR, 33:3, pp. 355–89.
 Brewer, William D. (Fall, 1994). "Mary Shelley on the Therapeutic Value of Language." Papers on Language and Literature, 30, 4, pp. 387–407. [Analyzed the influence of the play on Mary Shelley's writings.]
 Brophy, Robert J. (1970). "'Tamar,' 'The Cenci,' and Incest." American Literature: A Journal of Literary History, Criticism, and Bibliography, 42, pp. 241–44.
 Bruhn, Mark J. (2001). "Prodigious mixtures and confusions strange": The Self-Subverting Mixed Style of The Cenci. Poetics Today, 22:713–763.
 Cameron, Kenneth N., and Horst Frenz. (December 1945). "The Stage History of Shelley's The Cenci." PMLA, Vol. 60, No. 4, pp. 1080–1105.
 Cheeke, Stephen. "Shelley's 'The Cenci': Economies of a 'Familiar' Language." Keats-Shelley Journal, 47, (1998), pp. 142–160.
 Curran, Stuart. Shelley's Cenci: Scorpions Ringed with Fire. Princeton, NJ: Princeton University Press, 1970.
 Curran, Stuart. "Shelleyan Drama." The Romantic Theatre: An International Symposium, pp. 61–78. Edited by Richard Allen Cave. Totowa, N.J.: Barnes and Noble, 1986.
 Davy, Daniel. “The Harmony of the Horrorscape: A Perspective on The Cenci.” Journal of Dramatic Theory and Criticism, 5, 1 (Fall 1990): 95–113.
 Donohue, Joseph W., Jr. "Shelley's Beatrice and the Romantic Concept of Tragic Character." Keats-Shelley Journal, 17, (1968), pp. 53–73.
 Endo, Paul. (Fall-Winter, 1996). "The Cenci: Recognizing the Shelleyan Sublime," TSLL, 38, pp. 379–97.
 Ferriss, Suzanne. (1991). "Reflection in a “many-sided mirror”: Shelley's the Cenci through the post-revolutionary prism." Nineteenth-Century Contexts, 15, 2, pp. 161–170.
 Ferriss, Suzanne. "Percy Bysshe Shelley's The Cenci and the 'Rhetoric of Tyranny.'" British Romantic Drama: Historical and Critical Essays. Ed. Terence Hoagwood and Daniel P. Watkins. Fairleigh Dickinson University Press, forthcoming.
 Finn, Mary, E. (Summer, 1996). "The Ethics and Aesthetics of Shelley's The Cenci," SIR, 35, pp. 177–97.
  Forman, Alfred, and H. Buxton Forman. Introduction to The Cenci: A Tragedy in Five Acts, pp. v–xii. New York: Phaeton Press, 1970. They label Shelley the “chief tragic poet since Shakespeare" in an essay first published in 1886.
 Gladden, Samuel Lyndon. Shelley's Textual Seductions: Plotting Utopia in the Erotic and Political Works. New York: Routledge, 2002.
 Goulding, Christopher. (2001). "Shelley Laughs: Comic Possibilities in 'The Cenci.'" KSR, 15, pp. 44–46.
 Goulding, Christopher. (2002). "Early Detective Drama in Percy Shelley's The Cenci." Notes and Queries, 49(1), pp. 40–41.
 Groseclose, Barbara. (1985). "The Incest Motif in Shelley's The Cenci." Comparative Drama, 19, pp. 222–39.
 Hall, Jean. "The Socialized Imagination: Shelley's 'The Cenci and Prometheus Unbound'." Studies in Romanticism, 23, 3, Percy Bysshe Shelley (Fall, 1984), pp. 339–350.
 Hammond, Eugene R. (1981). "Beatrice's Three Fathers: Successive Betrayal in Shelley's The Cenci." Essays in Literature, 8, pp. 25–32.
 Harrington-Lueker, D. "Imagination versus Introspection: 'The Cenci' and 'Macbeth'." Keats-Shelley Journal, 32, (1983), pp. 172–189.
 Harrison, Margot. (2000). "No Way for a Victim to Act?: Beatrice Cenci and the Dilemma of Romantic Performance." Studies in Romanticism.
 Hicks, Arthur C., and R. Milton Clarke. A Stage Version of Shelley's Cenci, by Arthur C. Hicks ... and R. Milton Clarke ... Based upon the Bellingham Theatre Guild's Production of the Tragedy, March, 6, 7, 8, 9, and 12, 1940. Caldwell, ID: The Caxton Printers, Ltd., 1945.
 Hunt, Leigh. “Leigh Hunt, 1820 Review, The Indicator.” In Shelley: The Critical Heritage, edited by James E. Barcus, pp. 200–06. London: Routledge & Kegan Paul, 1975.
 Kobetts, Renata. "Violent Names: Beatrice Cenci as Speaking Subject." Indiana University.
 Kohler, Michael. (Winter, 1998). "Shelley in Chancery: The Reimagination of the Paternalist State in The Cenci." Studies in Romanticism, 37, pp. 545–89.
 LaMonaca, Maria. "'A dark glory': The Divinely Violent Woman from Shelley to Hawthorne." Indiana University-Bloomington.
 Les Cenci de P. B. Shelley, traduction de Tola Dorian, avec Preface de A. C. Swinburne, Paris, 1883. (French translation).
 Lockridge, Laurence S. "Justice in The Cenci." Wordsworth Circle, 19.2 (1988): 95–98.
 Magarian, Barry. (Spring, 1996). "Shelley's The Cenci: Moral Ambivalence and Self-Knowledge," KSR, 10, pp. 181–204.
 Mathews, James W. (1984). "The Enigma of Beatrice Cenci: Shelley and Melville." South Atlantic Review 49.2, pp. 31–41.
 McWhir, Anne. "The Light and the Knife: Ab/Using Language in The Cenci." Keats-Shelley Journal, 38 (1989): 145–161.
 Mulhallen, Jacqueline. The Theatre of Shelley. Cambridge, UK: Open Book Publishers, 2010. https://doi.org/10.11647/OBP.0011 
 Nielsen, Wendy C. (2004). "Censored Acts: Shelley’s The Cenci and the Terror of the Stage". Proceedings of the Ninth Nordic Conference for English Studies, Terror and Literature Panel.
 Pfeiffer, Karl G. "Landor's Critique of 'The Cenci'." Studies in Philology, 39, 4 (October 1942), pp. 670–679.
 Potkay, Monica Brzezinski. (Spring, 2004). "Incest as theology in Shelley's The Cenci." Wordsworth Circle, Vol. 35.
 Rees, Joan. “Shelley's Orsino: Evil in The Cenci.” Keats-Shelley Memorial Bulletin, 12 (1961): 3–6.
 Richardson, Donna. "The Hamartia of Imagination in Shelley's Cenci." Keats-Shelley Journal, 44 (1995): 216–239.
 Rieger, James. "Shelley's Paterin Beatrice." Studies in Romanticism, 4 (1965).
 Rieger, James. The Mutiny Within: The Heresies of Percy Bysshe Shelley. New York: George Braziller, 1967.
 Roberts, Hugh. (July 2009). "Mere poetry and strange flesh: Shelley's The Cenci and Calderón's El Purgatorio de San Patricio." European Romantic Review, Volume 20, Issue 3, pp. 345–366.
 Rossington, Michael, and Kelvin Everest. "Shelley, The Cenci and The French Revolution", in Revolution in Writing: British Literary Responses to the French Revolution, pp. 138–57. Open University Press, 1991.
 Roussetzki, Remy. (Winter, 2000). "Theater of Anxiety in Shelley's The Cenci and Musset's Lorenzaccio." Criticism.
 Schell, John F. “Shelley's The Cenci: Corruption and the Calculating Faculty.” University of Mississippi Studies in English, n. s. 2 (1981): 1–14.
 Shelley, Percy Bysshe. The Cenci: A Tragedy in Five Acts: An Authoritative Text Based on the 1819 Edition. Edited by Cajsa C. Baldini. Kansas City, MO: Valancourt, 2008.
 Smith, Paul. “Restless Casuistry: Shelley's Composition of The Cenci.” Keats-Shelley Journal, 13 (Winter, 1964): 77–85.
 Sperry, Stuart M. "The Ethical Politics of Shelley's 'The Cenci'." Studies in Romanticism, 25, 3, Homage to Carl Woodring (Fall, 1986), pp. 411–427.
 Steffan, Truman Guy. (1969). "Seven Accounts of the Cenci and Shelley's Drama." SEL: Studies in English Literature 1500–1900, 9, 4, pp. 601–618.
 Strand, Ginger, and Sarah Zimmerman. (Winter, 1996). "Finding an Audience: Beatrice Cenci, Percy Shelley, and the Stage." European Romantic Review, 6, pp. 246–68.
 Swinburne, Algernon Charles. "Les Cenci". Studies in Prose and Poetry. London: Chatto and Windus, 1894.
 Tung, Chung-hsuan. (2008). "'Beauty is Goodness, Goodness Beauty': Shelley's 'Awful Shadow' and 'Ethical Sublime'." Intergrams, 8.2–9.1.
Tatlock, John S. P., and Robert Grant Martin, editors. Representative English Plays, From the Middle Ages to the End of the Nineteenth Century. NY, The Century Co., 1916.
 Turner, Justin G. “The Cenci: Shelley vs. the Truth.” American Book Collector, 22, 5 (February 1972): 5–9.
 Twitchell, James B. "Shelley's Use of Vampirism in The Cenci." Tennessee Studies in Literature, 24 (1979), 120–33.
 “Unsigned Review, The Literary Gazette, and Journal of Belles Lettres, Arts, Sciences.” In Shelley: The Critical Heritage, edited by James E. Barcus, pp. 164–68. London: Routledge & Kegan Paul, 1975. In this 1820 review, the critic condemns The Cenci as “the production of a fiend, and calculated for the entertainment of devils in hell.”
 Wallace, Jennifer. (Summer, 2002). "Romantic Electra: The Case of Shelley's Beatrice." Didaskalia, 5, 3. University of Warwick, edited by Hugh Denard and C.W. Marshall.
 Weinberg, Alan M. “Religion and Patriarchy in Shelley's The Cenci.” Unisa English Studies,  28, 1 (April 1990): 5–13.
 White, Harry. "Beatrice Cenci and Shelley's Avenger." Essays in Literature, 5.1 (Spring, 1978).
 White, Harry. "Relative Means and Ends in Shelley's Social-Political Thought." SEL: Studies in English Literature 1500–1900, 22, 4, Nineteenth Century (Autumn, 1982), pp. 613–631.
 Whitman, Robert F. (1959). "Beatrice's 'Pernicious Mistake' in the Cenci." Modern Language Association.
 Wilson, James D. “Beatrice Cenci and Shelley's Vision of Moral Responsibility.” Ariel, 9, 3 (July 1978): 75–89.
 Worton, Michael. "Speech and Silence in The Cenci." Essays on Shelley, pp. 105–24.. Edited by Miriam Allott. Liverpool: Liverpool UP, 1982.

External links
 Text at Bartleby.com
 

 Introductory note at Bartleby.com
 New York Times review of 2008 performance based on Artaud adaptation.
 2008 New York Times review "It’s Not Just Cruel; It’s Unusual, Too" of the Artaud adaptation
 2008 University of Guelph, Ontario, Canada production of The Cenci
 Vassar College production of The Cenci directed by Michael Barakiva
 1997 premiere of Havergal Brian opera based on the play

Plays by Percy Bysshe Shelley
1819 plays
Incest in fiction
Works by Percy Bysshe Shelley
1810s works
Plays adapted into operas
Plays based on real people
Plays set in Italy
Plays set in the 16th century
Cultural depictions of Beatrice Cenci